Nebularia ustulata is a species of sea snail, a marine gastropod mollusc in the family Mitridae, the miters or miter snails.

References

ustulata
Gastropods described in 1844